The men's 800 metres event  at the 1995 IAAF World Indoor Championships was held on 10–12 March.

Medalists

Results

Heats
First 2 of each heat (Q) and next 2 fastest (q) qualified for the semifinals.

Semifinals
First 3 of each semifinal qualified directly (Q) for the final.

Final

References

800
800 metres at the World Athletics Indoor Championships